Kelachay (also Romanized as Kelāchāy, Kelā Chāy, and Kalā Chāy; also known as Kala Cha) is a city and capital of Kelachay District, in Rudsar County, Gilan Province, Iran.

It is located on the Caspian Sea.

At the 2006 census, its population was 11,304, in 3,338 families.

References

Cities in Gilan Province
Populated places in Rudsar County
Populated coastal places in Iran
Populated places on the Caspian Sea